The Fisher Flyer was a single seat tricycle landing gear biplane ultralight aircraft first flown by Michael Fisher in July 1980. It was the first aircraft designed by Fisher and became the first of more than 3500 Fisher aircraft flying by 2007.

Development
The Flyer was intended to meet the requirements of the US FAR 103 Ultralight Vehicles category under regulatory consideration at the time the aircraft was built, including that category's maximum  empty weight.

The aircraft was a conventional single seat ultralight based on the wings taken from the Easy Riser hang glider. The fuselage and tail were of original design. The airframe structure was of aluminum tube, covered with aircraft fabric. The landing gear was of a fixed tricycle configuration.

The Flyer was fitted with a  Zenoah engine.

Operational history
Only one Flyer was built and, because FAR Part 103 was not in effect yet, the aircraft was registered as an Experimental – Amateur-built. As of October 2009 the aircraft is no longer registered with the FAA.

Specifications (Flyer)

See also

References

1980s United States ultralight aircraft
Biplanes
Aircraft first flown in 1980
Single-engined tractor aircraft